The Church of St Elli, Llanelly, Monmouthshire, Wales, is a parish church with its origins in the 14th century. The church underwent three major restorations, in 1867–1868, 1897 and 1910–1911. It remains an active parish church and is a Grade II* listed building. The church is dedicated to the 6th-century Saint Elli, who may have been a daughter or granddaughter of King Brychan, or a male disciple of Saint Cadoc.

History
The church dates from the 14th century, or earlier, but little remains of this period. The nave is medieval but its walls were all rebuilt in the restorations of the 19th and 20th centuries. The first of these rebuildings took place in 1867–1868, and was undertaken by the architect Joseph Nevill of Abergavenny. The spire dates from the restoration of 1897 by Baldwin of Brecon. The final rebuilding was undertaken by J. Vaughan Richards of Crickhowell in 1910–1911.

Until local government reorganisation of 1974, the parish of Llanelly was in the historic county of Brecknockshire and St Elli's remains an active church under the administration of the Diocese of Swansea and Brecon, although the parish is now in Monmouthshire.

Architecture and description
The church is built of Old Red Sandstone rubble. It comprises a nave with west tower, chancel, aisle and porch. The architectural historian John Newman considered the "broad and squat" tower the most memorable feature.

The interior contains some monuments of "unusually high quality" which are noted in the church's listing record for its Grade II* designation.

Notes

References
 

Llanelly
History of Monmouthshire
Llanelly